Arion is an opera by the French composer Jean-Baptiste Matho, first performed at the Académie Royale de Musique (the Paris Opera) on 10 April 1714. It takes the form of a tragédie en musique in a prologue and five acts. The libretto, by Louis Fuzelier, is based on the Greek myth of the poet Arion.

Sources
 Libretto at "Livres baroques"
 Félix Clément and Pierre Larousse Dictionnaire des Opéras, Paris, 1881

Operas
Tragédies en musique
French-language operas
1714 operas